The nominees for the 2016 Ovation Awards aka the 27th Annual LA STAGE Alliance Ovation Awards were announced on November 2, 2016, by the Los Angeles Stage Alliance.

The awards were presented for excellence in stage productions in the Los Angeles area from September 2015 to August 2016 based upon evaluations from approximately 250 members of the Los Angeles theater community. The Ovation Awards are the only peer-judged theater awards in Los Angeles.

The winners were announced on January 17, 2017, in a ceremony at the Ahmanson Theatre in Los Angeles, California.  The ceremony was hosted by actress Alexandra Billings.

Awards 
Winners are listed first and highlighted in boldface.

Ovation Honors 
Ovation Honors recognize outstanding achievement in areas that are not among the standard list of nomination categories.

 Composition for a Play – Gregory Nabours - The Sparrow - Coeurage Theatre Company
 Fight Choreography – Edgar Landa - That Pretty Pretty; Or, The Rape Play - Son Of Semele Ensemble
 Puppet Design – Greg Ballora, Sean Cawelti, Christine Papalexis, Jack Pullman, Brian White - Wood Boy Dog Fish - Bootleg Theater & Rogue Artists Ensemble

References 

Ovation Awards
Ovation
2016 in Los Angeles
Ovation